Crotaphopeltis is a genus of snakes in the family Colubridae. The genus is endemic to Sub-Saharan Africa.

Species
The following six species are recognized as being valid.
Crotaphopeltis barotseensis 
Crotaphopeltis braestrupi 
Crotaphopeltis degeni 
Crotaphopeltis hippocrepis 
Crotaphopeltis hotamboeia 
Crotaphopeltis tornieri 

Nota bene: A binomial authority in parentheses indicates that the species was originally described in a genus other than Crotaphopeltis.

References

Further reading
Branch, Bill (2004). Field Guide to Snakes and other Reptiles of Southern Africa. Third Revised edition, Second impression. Sanibel Island, Florida: Ralph Curtis Books. 399 pp. . (Genus Crotaphopeltis, p. 96).
Fitzinger L (1843). Systema Reptilium, Fasciculus Primus, Amblyglossae. Vienna: Braumüller & Seidel. 106 pp. + indices. (Crotaphopeltis, new genus, p. 27). (in Latin).

Crotaphopeltis
Snake genera